Bragging Room Guest (Korean: 자랑방손님) was a KBS variety show, co-hosted by Park Myung-soo and Kim Hee-chul.

Format 
The sheer number of TV and radio programs dedicated in sharing viewers' worries and difficulties seems to convey that most of our lives are filled with shame and regrets over our mistakes and failures. However, mistakes and failures are the fertilizer of success and what make us stronger and better. In Bragging Room Guest, viewers share their life stories in a form of bragging. For the first time in Korea's broadcasting history, the show hosts will film the show at their home, and viewers will be able to communicate with the hosts while watching the live streaming of the show.

List of episodes

References 

Korean Broadcasting System original programming
South Korean variety television shows
Korean-language television shows
2017 South Korean television series debuts
2017 South Korean television series endings